The 2021 Annapolis mayoral election was held on November 2, 2021, to elect the mayor of Annapolis, Maryland. Incumbent Democratic mayor Gavin Buckley was re-elected to a second term.

Declared 

 Gavin Buckley, incumbent mayor (Democratic)
 Steven Strawn, chair of the Annapolis Republican Committee (Republican)

Results

References 

Annapolis
Annapolis
Annapolis
Mayoral elections in Annapolis, Maryland